Pat Bawtinheimer (born 24 November 1961) is a Canadian sports shooter. He competed in the mixed trap event at the 1984 Summer Olympics.

References

External links
 

1961 births
Living people
Canadian male sport shooters
Olympic shooters of Canada
Shooters at the 1984 Summer Olympics
Sportspeople from Red Deer, Alberta
20th-century Canadian people